Edward Coke MC (5 February 1879 – 5 April 1951), known professionally as Edward Rigby, was a British character actor.

Early life
Rigby was born at Ashford, Kent, England, the second son of Dr William Harriott Coke and his wife, Mary Elizabeth. He was educated at Haileybury, and Wye Agricultural College. Under his real name, Edward Coke (Rigby was his mother's maiden name), he served in the Artists' Rifles and the Royal Field Artillery in World War I and was awarded the Military Cross, cited on 17 September 1917 "for conspicuous gallantry and devotion to duty as artillery liaison officer. At a time when all communication with his artillery group was severed, he made repeated attempts to restore the connection, and personally crossed a river under heavy fire in his efforts to mend the cable and to lay fresh ones. He showed the greatest gallantry and disregard of danger throughout the operation, and only desisted from his efforts on receiving the direct order from his headquarters to do so."

In 1912, Rigby married Phyllis Muriel Mary Austin, a novelist (1888-1979).  Their son, Cyril Edward Rigby Coke, a television director, married Muriel Young (1923–2001), an ITV announcer and TV presenter.

Stage and screen career

He made his first stage appearance in 1900 at the Grand Theatre in Fulham and later toured Australia, United States and Canada. He followed his first film appearance, the 1910 silent The Blue Bird, with roles in more than 150 films from 1933 to 1951.

Death
He collapsed after a heart attack in the street at Richmond and when taken to Richmond Hospital was found to be dead. He was cremated at Mortlake Crematorium on 11 April 1951.

Selected filmography

 The Blue Bird (1910, Short) – Bread
 Lorna Doone (1934) – Reuben 'Uncle Ben' Huckaback
 Windfall (1935) – Sam Spooner
 No Limit (1935) – Grandfather
 Gay Old Dog (1935) – Tom Bliss
 Queen of Hearts (1936) – Perkins
 This Green Hell (1936) – Dan Foyle
 Land Without Music (1936) – The Maestro
 Crime Over London (1936) – (uncredited)
 The Heirloom Mystery (1936) – Charles Marriott
 Accused (1936) – Alphonse de la Riveire
 Irish for Luck (1936) – Hon. Denis Maguire
 Jump for Glory (1937) – Sanders
 The Show Goes On (1937) – Mr. Scowcroft, Sally's Father
 The Fatal Hour (1937) – Cready
 Under a Cloud (1937) – Jimmy Forbes
 Mr. Smith Carries On (1937) – Mr. Smith
 Young and Innocent (1937) – Old Will
 A Yank at Oxford (1938) – Scatters
 Kicking the Moon Around (1938) – Prof. Scattlebury
 Yellow Sands (1938) – Tom Major
 The Ware Case (1938) – Tommy Bold
 Keep Smiling (1938) – Silas Gray
 The Four Just Men (1939) – (uncredited)
 There Ain't No Justice (1939) – Pa Mutch
 Poison Pen (1939) – Badham
 Young Man's Fancy (1939) – Gray
 The Stars Look Down (1940) – Robert Fenwick
 The Proud Valley (1940) – Bert
 Convoy (1940) – Mr. Matthews
 Girl in the News (1940) – Hospital Secretary (uncredited)
 Sailors Don't Care (1940) – Joe Clark
 The Farmer's Wife (1941) – Tom Gurney
 Fingers (1941) – Sam Bromley
 Major Barbara (1941) – Man on Quayside (uncredited)
 Kipps (1941) – Buggins
 The Common Touch (1941) – 'Tich'
 Penn of Pennsylvania (1941) – Bushell
 Flying Fortress (1942) – Dan Billings (uncredited)
 Let the People Sing (1942) – Timmy Tiverton
 Salute John Citizen (1942) – Mr. Bunting
 Went the Day Well? (1942) – Bill Purvis
 Get Cracking (1943) – Sam Elliott
 They Met in the Dark (1943) – Mansel
 A Canterbury Tale (1944) – Jim Horton
 Don't Take It to Heart (1944) – Butler
 I Live in Grosvenor Square (1945) – Innkeeper
 The Agitator (1945) – Charlie Branfield
 Perfect Strangers (1945) – Charlie
 Murder in Reverse? (1945) – Spike
 The Years Between (1946) – Postman
 Quiet Weekend (1946) – Sam Pecker
 Piccadilly Incident (1946) – Judd
 Temptation Harbour (1947) – Tatem
 The Courtneys of Curzon Street (1947) – Mr. R (Stock Exchange Sweeper / Cleaner) (uncredited)
 Green Fingers (1947) – Albert Goodman
 The Loves of Joanna Godden (1947) – Stuppeny
 Easy Money (1948) – Teddy (segment The Teddy Ball Story)
 The Three Weird Sisters (1948) – Waldo
 Daybreak (1948) – Bill Shackle
 Noose (1948) – Slush
 It's Hard to Be Good (1948) – Parkinson
 All Over the Town (1949) – Grimmett
 Christopher Columbus (1949) – Pedro
 Don't Ever Leave Me (1949) – Harry Denton
 A Run for Your Money (1949) – Beefeater
 Rover and Me (1949) – Mr. Maggott
 Poet's Pub – Pageant watching villager (uncredited)
 The Happiest Days of Your Life (1950) – Rainbow
 Double Confession (1950) – The Fisherman
 Tony Draws a Horse (1950) – Grandpa
 What the Butler Saw (1950) – The Earl
 The Mudlark (1950) – The Watchman (uncredited)
 Into the Blue (1950) – Bill, the Skipper
 Circle of Danger (1951) – Idwal Llewellyn (final film role)

References

External links
 

1879 births
1951 deaths
20th-century English male actors
Alumni of Wye College
Artists' Rifles officers
British Army personnel of World War I
English male film actors
Male actors from Kent
People educated at Haileybury and Imperial Service College
People from Ashford, Kent
Recipients of the Military Cross
Royal Field Artillery officers